Ua Huka Airport is an airport on Ua Huka in French Polynesia . The airport is 2.2 km southwest of the village of Hane. The airport was opened on November 4, 1970, with the first landings made by an Air Tahiti Piper Aztec and an RAI Twin Otter. Commercial flights began in 1971. As of 2021 it received 1600 passengers a year.

Airlines and destinations

Statistics

References

External links
 

Airports in French Polynesia
Ua Huka